Daniel Curtis may refer to:

 Daniel Curtis (politician), American politician from New York
 Daniel Curtis (musician), Welsh Composer and Producer
 Daniel Sargent Curtis (1825–1908), American lawyer and banker
 Dan Curtis (1927–2006), American director and producer
 Dan Curtis (politician), mayor of Whitehorse, Yukon
 Danny Beard (drag queen)